Lane Toran Caudell (born October 15, 1982) is an American actor and musician. He is known for his voice roles on Disney's Recess and Nickelodeon's Hey Arnold!

Career
Toran played Rod on 7th Heaven, an American television series about a Protestant minister's family living in the fictional town of Glenoak, California.

In animation, he is probably best known as the voice of King Bob on Disney's Recess. He was the first actor to provide the voice of the title role of Arnold Shortman, and later on in the series, the voice of Wolfgang, the leader of the sadistic and heartless 5th grade bullies, on the Nickelodeon animated show Hey Arnold!

In the film Max Is Missing (1995), Toran played the part of a 12-year-old boy who accompanies his family on vacation to Peru. He is separated from his father while visiting the ancient Incan ruins of Machu Picchu. Thieves chase him after he is given a priceless mask by a dying man.

Over a year later, Toran starred in the light-hearted fantasy Johnny Mysto: Boy Wizard. In this film, aimed at a pre-teen audience, he plays the part of a budding young magician who stumbles across an unusual ring. He embarks on a medieval, time-travel quest to find his enchanted sister and ends up in Camelot before King Arthur. It turns out the ring belongs to none other than Merlin.

The actor/musician has also sung the lead vocals for several TV series and has appeared on stage in Oliver!, Peter Pan and Li'l Abner. He has also played Conrad Birdie in Bye Bye Birdie, the Lion in the Wiz and the Prince in Cinderella in theatre.

Together with Haylie Duff he co-wrote the song "Sweet Sixteen" on Hilary Duff's second studio album Metamorphosis.

Toran announced in 2016 on his Instagram profile, that he would return to Hey Arnold! to voice some characters for the television movie Hey Arnold!: The Jungle Movie that would be released in 2017.

He has also sung lead vocals on his own original songs and also with the band DieRadioDie in Los Angeles.

Personal life
Toran was married to actress Jaclyn Betham from 2012–2020. He is the son of musician/singer Lane Caudell.

Filmography

References

External links
 
 Caudell voice demo reel on voicebank.net (mp3)

1982 births
Living people
20th-century American male actors
21st-century American male actors
21st-century American male singers
21st-century American singers
American male child actors
American male television actors
American male voice actors
Male actors from Los Angeles
Singers from Los Angeles